Urania was a privately circulated feminist gender studies journal, published between 1916 and 1940. Editors included Eva Gore-Booth, Esther Roper, Irene Clyde, Dorothy Cornish, and Jessey Wade. It was published bimonthly from 1916 to 1920, then triannually due to high costs.

Background 
Many of the editors of the journal were connected through the Aëthnic Union, a short-lived feminist revolutionary group formed in 1911.

History 
Urania's intention was to challenge gender stereotypes and advance the abolishment of gender; each issue was headed with the statement: "There are no 'men' or 'women' in Urania." "Sex is an accident" was a term frequently used in the journal.

It was privately published by D. R. Mitra, Manoranjan Press, Bombay.

The journal remained private for its 24-year history; a distributors' note at the end of each edition stated "Urania is not published, nor offered to the public, but [...] can be had by friends." Urania's editors deliberately fostered an informal network of supporters and sympathisers, encouraging readers to send in their names to a register. The journal claimed to have a circulation of around 250.

Content 
Amongst other content, the journal published articles about feminist movements around the world and compiled information about successful gender-reassignment surgeries.

See also 
 Das 3. Geschlecht

References

Further reading 
 
 

Bimonthly journals
Defunct journals of the United Kingdom
English-language journals
Feminist journals
Gender studies journals
LGBT-related journals
Publications established in 1916
Publications disestablished in 1940
Triannual journals
Transgender literature